The 2010 Uzbekistan Cup was the 18th season of the annual Uzbek football Cup competition. The competition started on March 20, 2010, and ended on August 18, 2010, with the final held at the Pakhtakor Markaziy Stadium in Tashkent. FC Pakhtakor were the defending champions.

The cup winner were guaranteed a place in the 2011 AFC Champions League.

Calendar

First round

|}

Round of 32

|}

Round of 16

|}

Quarterfinals

|}

Semifinals

|}

Final

References

External links
Soccerway.com
RSSSF.com

Cup
Uzbekistan Cup
2010